Kai Øverland (27 February 1931 – 27 August 1975) was a Norwegian trade unionist and politician for the Socialist Left Party.

He was born in Trondheim, and took a vocational education. He worked as a plumber from 1947 to 1969, then as a surveyor for the Plumbers' Union in Trondheim. Øverland began his political career as a trade unionist, serving as secretary of the Plumbers' Union from 1958 to 1972. From 1961 to 1968 he chaired the Socialist People's Party in Trondheim as well as Sør-Trøndelag, and was a national board member. He was selected as board member of Trondheim Sporvei (1964–1971), and then elected to two terms in Trondheim city council from 1967 to 1975.

Øverland soon became a deputy member of the board Trondheim og Omegn Boligbyggelag (1968–1971) and Graakalbanen (1968–1971) and in the supervisory council of Fosen Trafikklag (1968–1974). He was a board member of Trondheim Trafikkselskap (1968–1973) and Trondheim og Omegn Boligbyggelag (1972–1973), and also chaired Trondheim Socialist People's Party for a second time from 1970 to 1973.

He went on to national politics as a representative to the Parliament of Norway from Sør-Trøndelag, elected in 1973. He took a seat in the Standing Committee on Standing Committee on Local Government and the Environment. After a mere 1 year and 331 days, he died and was replaced by partyfellow Aud Gustad.

References

1931 births
1975 deaths
Norwegian trade unionists
Socialist Left Party (Norway) politicians
Politicians from Trondheim
Members of the Storting
20th-century Norwegian politicians